Westbury Ironstone Quarry is a 5,600 square metre geological Site of Special Scientific Interest just west of Westbury in Wiltshire, England, notified in 1965. The quarry was once an important source of Upper Oxfordian Westbury Iron Ore.

Sources
 English Nature citation sheet for the site (accessed 25 July 2006)

External links
 English Nature website (SSSI information)

Sites of Special Scientific Interest in Wiltshire
Sites of Special Scientific Interest notified in 1965
Westbury, Wiltshire
Quarries in Wiltshire